is a tram stop on the Tokyo Sakura Tram in Toshima, Tokyo, Japan, operated by Tokyo Metropolitan Bureau of Transportation (Toei).

Lines 

Station layout
The station has two side platforms located on either side of a level crossing.

History 
The station opened on 12 November 1925, originally named . It was renamed Toden-zoshigaya on 14 June 2008 to avoid confusion with Zoshigaya Station which opened on the Tokyo Metro Fukutoshin Line subway on the same day.

Surrounding area

 Zoshigaya Cemetery
 Toshima Ward Office

See also
 List of railway stations in Japan

References

External links

Toei station information 

Railway stations in Tokyo
Railway stations in Japan opened in 1925
Buildings and structures in Toshima